"The Hellcat Spangled Shalalala" is a song by the English rock band Arctic Monkeys, from their 2011 album Suck It and See.

Release
The 7" vinyl features only one B-side titled "Little Illusion Machine (Wirral Riddler)" and is credited to Miles Kane and the Death Ramps. The Death Ramps is a pseudonym previously adopted by the band when they released a limited edition vinyl with "Teddy Picker" B-sides "Nettles" and "The Death Ramps" back in 2007.

The music video for the single premiered on 7 July 2011 on YouTube. It was directed by Focus Creeps and featured footages of the band and model Scarlett Kapella as the "hellcat."

The B-side "Little Illusion Machine (Wirral Riddler)" was made available for streaming the on 8 August.

On 8 August 2011, most of the stock of the single was destroyed in the fire at the PIAS Entertainment Group's warehouse during the 2011 London Riots, severely hindering the single's retail release. The limited amount of remaining inventory was released exclusively on the band's website.

Track listing

Personnel

Arctic Monkeys
Alex Turner – lead vocals, rhythm guitar ; lead guitar, backing vocals 
Jamie Cook – lead guitar ; rhythm guitar 
Nick O'Malley – bass guitar; backing vocals 
Matt Helders – drums, backing vocals

Additional personnel
Miles Kane – lead vocals

Charts

Release history

References

2011 singles
Arctic Monkeys songs
Songs written by Alex Turner (musician)
Song recordings produced by James Ford (musician)
2011 songs
Songs written by Miles Kane
Domino Recording Company singles